Kakki Reservoir is a reservoir, located in Pathanamthitta district of Kerala, India. The lake, which was created when Kakki Dam and Anathode dam were built, is on one of the tributaries of Pamba, the Kakki tributary. The dams were built in 1966 as part of the Sabarigiri Hydroelectric project. Full reservoir level (FRL) is 981.45 meters above sea level according to the operators of the "twin" reservoirs, the Kerala State Electricity Board. The reservoir, which is also a tourist spot, is nestled in the Ranni reserve forest, very close to the Western Ghats.

Features
Water Spread Area : 17.6 Sq. Km.
Catchment Area :225.51 Sq. Km.
Average Rainfall: 4572 mm
Full Reservoir Level (FRL):3220 Ft (Above MSL)
Minimum Drawdown level (MDDL):3135 Ft (Above MSL)
Effective Storage at FRL:447.76 MCM
Energy Equivalent at FRL :722.2 MU
Average head at power house :2499 ft

See also 
 List of dams and reservoirs in Kerala

References 

Reservoirs in Kerala
1966 establishments in Kerala
Buildings and structures in Pathanamthitta district